Promises, Promises may refer to:

Music 
 Promises, Promises (musical), a 1968 musical based on the 1960 film The Apartment, or the title song

Albums 
 Promises, Promises (Die! Die! Die! album) or the title song, 2008
 Promises, Promises (Dionne Warwick album), including the title song from the musical, 1968
 Promises, Promises (Lynn Anderson album) or the title song (see below), 1967
 Promises, Promises, by Lake Street Dive, 2008

Songs 
 "Promises, Promises" (The Cooper Temple Clause song), 2003
 "Promises, Promises" (Incubus song), 2011
 "Promises, Promises" (Lynn Anderson song), 1968
 "Promises, Promises" (Naked Eyes song), 1983
 "Promises, Promises", by Christopher Williams from Adventures in Paradise, 1989
 "Promises, Promises", by Nik Kershaw from You've Got to Laugh, 2006

Television episodes 
 "Promises, Promises" (ALF), 1988
 "Promises Promises!" (The Raccoons), 1990
 "Promises, Promises" (Roseanne), 1993
 Promises, Promises, an episode of Shining Time Station, 1989

Other media 
 Promises! Promises!, a 1963 American sex-comedy film
 Promises, Promises, a Beacon Street Girls novel by Annie Bryant

See also
 Promise (disambiguation)
 The Promise (disambiguation)
 A Promise (disambiguation)